San Javier Island is an island in the fjords and channels of southern Chile. The island lies immediately to the east of the Gulf of Penas and south of the Gulf of San Esteban. Administratively the island belong to the commune of Tortel in Aysén Region.

The Antonio de Vea expedition reached the island on December 25, 1675 calling it "Isla San Esteban".

References

Islands of Aysén Region
Uninhabited islands of Chile